Henk Kuijpers (born 10 December 1946 in Haarlem, Netherlands) is a comics artist most famous for his Franka series.

Comics

Franka, 23 comic albums
Bars, 2 albums

Kuijpers' Franka comics work features a strong model-like female sleuth solving mysteries, often in exotic locales. The series' images are drawn in strong lines with balanced weight, a style often classified as ligne claire.

Awards
Kuijpers received the Stripschapprijs prize in 1990.

References

External links
 Franka official site

1946 births
Living people
Dutch comics artists
Artists from Haarlem
Winners of the Stripschapsprijs